Odontocis is a genus of tree-fungus beetles in the family Ciidae.

Species
 Odontocis denticollis Nakane & Nobuchi, 1955

References

Ciidae genera